The 2017 Pro Mazda Championship was the 19th season in series history. A 12-race schedule was announced in September 2016.

This was the final season using the Star chassis and Mazda rotary engine combination. In 2018, the Tatuus-designed PM18 chassis would be the specified car, mated to a Mazda MZR piston engine.

Brazilian Victor Franzoni, who secured his ride in Pro Mazda with Juncos Racing the week before the season started, prevailed in a season-long back-and-forth championship battle with 2016 U.S. F2000 National Championship winner Anthony Martin. Franzoni held a small lead heading into the series' final double-header at Watkins Glen International. Franzoni won both races to clinch the championship. Franzoni finished first or second in every race and finished with seven wins from six poles. Martin won five races from six poles. Carlos Cunha captured podium finishes in the last five races (for six total) to capture third in the championship ahead of TJ Fischer who finished on the podium in the first four races but faded down the stretch. Every race was won by either Franzoni or Martin and every pole but one was captured by them, with Cunha sitting on the pole for the first race at the Mid-Ohio Sports Car Course.

The less-expensive National Class was more hotly contested than usual on an individual race basis, with some races seeing as many as five entries. However, only one driver Brendan Puderbach contested all twelve rounds of the championship and by virtue of that captured the National Class title. Bob Kaminsky captured a class-best five class wins and finished second in the championship.

Drivers and teams

Race calendar and results

Championship standings

Drivers' Championship

Teams' championship

See also
2017 IndyCar Series season
2017 Indy Lights championship

References

External links
 

Pro Mazda Championship
Indy Pro 2000 Championship